Neh or NEH may refer to:

Places
Neh, Iran, a city in South Khorasan Province, Iran
Neh, Kurdistan, a city in Kurdistan Province, Iran
Neh Rural District, an administrative subdivision of South Khorasan Province, Iran

Abbreviations and acronyms
N-Ethylhexedrone, a stimulant drug
Neutrophilic eccrine hidradenitis,  a cutaneous complication of chemotherapy
National Endowment for the Humanities, a US government agency
The Book of Nehemiah (Neh.), in the Hebrew Bible
New English Hymnal, a book of hymns etc.
North East Humanists, England
Non-expanding horizon of a black hole
Netherlands School of Economics (Nederlandse Economische Hogeschool), now Erasmus University Rotterdam
Neonium, the ion NeH+
The National Rail station code for New Eltham railway station, London, England